Edward Michael O'Connor (3 June 1877 – 12 July 1956) was an Australian rules footballer who played with St Kilda in the Victorian Football League (VFL).

Notes

External links 

1877 births
1956 deaths
Australian rules footballers from Victoria (Australia)
St Kilda Football Club players